Huaisu (737–799), courtesy name Zangzhen,  was a Buddhist monk and calligrapher of the Tang Dynasty, famous for his cursive calligraphy. Fewer than 10 pieces of his works have survived. One of his representative works is Huai Su's Autobiography.

He was born in modern Changsha, Hunan. Not much is known of his early life. His secular surname may have been Qian. It is possible that Huaisu was a nephew of the poet Qian Qi. He became a monk in his childhood, apparently out of poverty.

Legend has it that he planted banana trees (or any genus of trees under Musaceae) in the courtyard of the temple he lived, and used the leaves as paper to practice his art. He made his national fame in his early thirties when he came to Chang'an, which was then capital of China. Famous poets of his time spoke highly of his works, including Li Bai. Like Li Bai, he was fond of alcohol.

Traditionally Huaisu is paired with the older Zhang Xu as the two greatest cursive calligraphers of the Tang Dynasty. The duo is affectionately referred to as "the crazy Zhang and the drunk Su".

Notes

References
 Zhu, Guantian, "Huai Su". Encyclopedia of China (Arts Edition), 1st ed.

External links
 Huai Su and his Calligraphy Gallery at China Online Museum
 Huaisu's Autobiography (in Classical Chinese)
 Huai Su's Autobiography: Modelling (Shu Version), History, English Translation and A Preliminary Study - a detailed analysis and translation of Huai Su's Autobiography.
 Bio with English (and hypertext dictionary)

737 births
799 deaths
Tang dynasty calligraphers
Tang dynasty Buddhist monks
Artists from Changsha
7th-century Chinese calligraphers